Mamers is a commune in the Sarthe department in the region of Pays de la Loire in north-western France. The neighboring communes are: Commerveil, Saint-Longis, Saint-Rémy-des-Monts, Origny-le-Roux, Suré. Mamers is twinned with the town Market Rasen in Lincolnshire, England.

Population

See also
Communes of the Sarthe department

References

Communes of Sarthe
Subprefectures in France
Maine (province)
Sarthe communes articles needing translation from French Wikipedia